Romil and Jugal is an Indian Hindi web series, produced by Ekta Kapoor for her video on demand platform ALTBalaji. Rajeev Siddhartha and Manraj Singh are the main protagonists of the series. The first debut of Raj Routh as a writer in the alt balaji production includes all the love twist and drama. The series follows two young gay men, and the way the society accept/treat them.

The series is available for streaming on the ALT Balaji App and its associated websites since its release date.

Plot
The series concerns two modern men who fall in love with each other. Jugal (Manraj Singh), a Tamil-Brahman boy, is a little bit shy but falls in love with Romil (Rajeev Siddhartha), a Punjabi hunk and playboy. After spending time and navigating life together, they successfully become accepted by their narrow minded society. Their orthodox family also becomes more aware. They understand that their relationship is completely genuine and that they can't live without each other. They end up being accepted as a couple by both the general society and their families.

Cast
 Rajeev Siddhartha as Romil Kohli
 Manraj Singh as Jugal Subramaniam
 Mandira Bedi as Ahalya
 Hariman Dhanjal as Mehul
 Shrishti Ganguly Rindani as Ramya Subramaniam
 Manini Mishra as Sunita Kohli
 Suchitra Pillai as Bhagyalaxmi Subramaniam
 Vritika Ramnani as Meher
 Rohan Mehra as Amit
 Mudita Shauq as Dimple Kohli
 Bhuvnesh Shetty as Sridhar Subramaniam
 Harssh A. Singh as Rajinder Kohli
 Divina Thakur as Kenny Desai

List of episodes
Though the series is originally shot in Hindi, its available as dubbed versions in three languages (Dravidian languages); Malayalam, Tamil and Telugu.

References

External links
 Watch Romil and Jugal on ALT Balaji website
 

2017 web series debuts
Hindi-language web series
Indian LGBT-related web series
ALTBalaji original programming
Works based on Romeo and Juliet